William Summer Johnson (February 24, 1913 – August 19, 1995) was an American chemist and teacher.

From 1940 to 1958, Johnson was an instructor and then professor at the University of Wisconsin–Madison.  In 1958, he moved to  Stanford University in California where he spent the remainder of his scientific career. He did important research in the artificial production of steroids and was awarded the National Medal of Science in 1987.

The Lemieux–Johnson oxidation, in which an olefin is converted into two aldehyde or ketone fragments, is named after him and Raymond Lemieux.

Education
PhD, Harvard University (1940)
AM, Harvard University
BA, magna cum laude, Amherst College (1936)

Awards
 1968 William H. Nichols Medal
 1987 National Medal of Science
 1989 Arthur C. Cope Award.
1991 Tetrahedron Prize for Creativity in Organic Chemistry & BioMedicinal Chemistry

References

External links

Memorial biography at Stanford University
National Academy of Sciences Biographical Memoir

1913 births
1995 deaths
20th-century American chemists
National Medal of Science laureates
Amherst College alumni
Harvard University alumni